Sharifi is a common Muslim surname most common among Iranians and Afghans. Among Arabs, the name takes the form al-Sharifi, which is a common surname in Iraq.

Al-Sharifi is a well-known surname in the holy city of Najaf. It usually means the "honorables". Loosely translated, it means "of high-class" or "wealthy".

In the city of Hamadan in Iran, Sharifi is a very old and big family with many sub-families such as Sharifi-Amina, Sharifi-Rahnamoon, Sharifi-Minoo, Sharifi-Gharib, Sharifi-Syed, Sharifi-Shah, Sharifi-Javidi, and Sharifi-Monzavi. There are other big families in this city like Mansour and Izadi. Mahmoud Sharifi Amina is a poet whose contributions to the folklore poetry of Hamedan is notable.

In fiction, it is the name of major characters Jennifer Sharifi and Miranda Sharifi in Nancy Kress's Sleepless series (Beggars in Spain, Beggars and Choosers, and Beggars Ride).

Notable people
Amredin Sharifi (born 1992), Afghan footballer
Habib Sharifi (born 1950s), Iranian footballer
Jamshied Sharifi (born 1960), American composer and musician
Mehdi Sharifi (born 1992), Iranian footballer
Mohammad Sharifi (born 1978), Saudi Arabian footballer 
Mohammad Sharifi (Iranian footballer) (born 2000), Iranian footballer
Naim Sharifi (born 1992), Russian footballer of Tajik origin
Nasser Sharifi (born 1921), Iranian former sports shooter
Rashid Sharifi (born 1984), Iranian weightlifter
Sohaila Sharifi, Afghan politician
Suleiman Sharifi (born 1958), Tajikistani artist

Places
Tolombeh-ye Rahmat Allah Sharifi, village in Kerman Province, Iran

Surnames
Arabic-language surnames
Persian-language surnames